Heidi Diethelm Gerber (born 20 March 1969 in Münsterlingen) is a Swiss female sport shooter. At the 2012 Summer Olympics, she competed in the Women's 10 metre air pistol and the Women's 25 metre pistol.  She finished in 35th in the 10 metre air pistol event and in 29th in the 25 metre event. At the 2016 Summer Olympics she won the bronze medal in the 25 metre pistol and was 35th in the 10 metre air pistol.

References

Swiss female sport shooters
Living people
Olympic shooters of Switzerland
Shooters at the 2012 Summer Olympics
Shooters at the 2016 Summer Olympics
1969 births
Shooters at the 2015 European Games
European Games gold medalists for Switzerland
European Games medalists in shooting
Olympic medalists in shooting
Olympic bronze medalists for Switzerland
Medalists at the 2016 Summer Olympics
Shooters at the 2019 European Games
European Games silver medalists for Switzerland
Shooters at the 2020 Summer Olympics
Sportspeople from Thurgau
21st-century Swiss women